James Anthony Johnson, known professionally as J. J. Johnson, is a Canadian-born writer, director, executive producer, and founding member of Sinking Ship Entertainment.  He is the creator of children's television programmes, including This is Daniel Cook, Dino Dana and Endlings. He also serves on the Youth Media Alliance board as a co-chair.

Early life 
One of four children, Johnson grew up in Elmira, Ontario and started experimenting with film and media in his final year of high school. Johnson was in the running for school president when he and two friends made a Saturday Night Live inspired video featuring Supermarket Sweep host Tino Monte. He won the election and through this victory he realized the power of media.

Career 
J. J. Johnson attended Ryerson University's RTA School of Media and graduated in 2002 along with fellow Sinking Ship Entertainment founders, Blair Powers and Matt Bishop. In their final year, Johnson and Powers pitched a project and tried to convince their peers to pick up the remaining crew roles. A classmate warned others who were interested to avoid joining as it'd be like "joining a sinking ship". The two friends registered a company in the same name later that day.

After graduating, Johnson worked at a talent agency where he met Daniel Cook, who became the inspiration behind This is Daniel Cook which debuted in 2004 with Sinking Ship Entertainment. Since then, Johnson has created and directed several popular shows such as Dino Dana, Endlings and Lockdown.

In January 2006, the operations of Sinking Ship Entertainment moved from Johnson's apartment to offices in Toronto.

On November 23, 2014, Sinking Ship Entertainment announced they would be co-producing Odd Squad along with Fred Rogers Productions for PBS Kids. The show went on to win several Daytime Emmy Awards which lead to the creation of Odd Squad Mobile Unit.

In 2021, he announced he will be working alongside Apple TV+ and the Jane Goodall Institute to create Jane, a kids' series that will follow a girl named Jane Garcia, a 10-year-old with an active imagination. Previously, Johnson had worked alongside Apple TV+ and Sesame Workshop to produce the reboot of the 1990's kids series Ghostwriter.

Filmography

Awards, nominations and honors

References

External links 

Rotten Tomatoes profile

Canadian television producers
Canadian television writers
21st-century Canadian screenwriters
21st-century Canadian male writers
Canadian male screenwriters
Canadian Screen Award winners
Daytime Emmy Award winners
Year of birth missing (living people)
Living people
Canadian television directors
Toronto Metropolitan University alumni
People from Woolwich, Ontario